Therese Islas Helgesson (born 1983) is a Swedish handball player. She plays for the club Nordstrand IF and for the Swedish national team. She participated at the 2008 Summer Olympics in China, where the Swedish team placed eight, and the 2012 Summer Olympics, where Sweden came 11th.

References

1983 births
Living people
Swedish female handball players
Handball players at the 2008 Summer Olympics
Handball players at the 2012 Summer Olympics
Olympic handball players of Sweden
21st-century Swedish women